Football in Kosovo is governed by the Football Federation of Kosovo, which was created in , as a branch of the Yugoslav Football Association. Prishtina, is the club from Kosovo with most participations in the Yugoslav First League. Football is the most popular sport in Kosovo.

The Football Superleague of Kosovo is the top division of football in Kosovo. The division was set up in 1945 as a regional league within the Yugoslav football league system.

In 2008, Kosovo declared its independence from Serbia. Until 2016, membership in UEFA and FIFA had been denied due to Kosovo's disputed recognition as an independent state. However, Kosovo was also not a member of the NF Board, which represents non-FIFA territories, including unrepresented cultural groups and unrecognized states. Some football clubs, especially from North Kosovo, refuse to enter the Republic of Kosovo's institutions and continue to be part of the Football Association of Serbia. On 3 May 2016, Kosovo became the 55th member of UEFA after a 28-24 vote in their favour, and on 13 May 2016, Kosovo gained FIFA membership after a 141-23 vote in their favour.

History
The first football clubs in Kosovo were formed after the First World War and they competed in the Belgrade Football Subassociation provincial leagues within the Yugoslav football league system.

During the Second World War, Yugoslavia was invaded by Axis powers, and most of Kosovo became part of German- Italian-dominated Albanian Kingdom.  Several city teams from Kosovo played during the war in the Albanian championship.  Two Kosovar Albanian players made headlines in Italian Serie A, Riza Lushta and Naim Kryeziu.

In 1945, Kosovo was reintegrated into Serbia and Yugoslavia. Football Federation of Kosovo was founded in 1946 and in 1948 was co-founder of ex-FF of Yugoslavia with equal rights and duties until 1991.
FC Prishtina and FK Trepča made it to the Yugoslav First League. In 1992 SFR Yugoslavia became FR Yugoslavia. In that period, all Albanian football players abandoned the Yugoslavian league and were part of the Independent League of Kosovo (1991) and first played match was Flamurtari - Prishtina(13 September 1991). First goal of Independent league was scored by Eroll Salihu, actually  General Secretary of FFK.

During this Yugoslav period most of the best players from Kosovo, regardless if Serb or Albanian, usually continued their career in stronger Yugoslav clubs.  Examples are Gorani Fahrudin Jusufi (European vice-champion in 1966 with Partizan), Albanians Xhevat Prekazi, Fadil Vokrri, Isa Sadriu, Agim Cana, Ardian Kozniku and Kujtim Shala, Serbs Stevan Stojanović (goalkeeper of Red Star Belgrade when they won the European and world club title in 1991), Goran Đorović, Marko Perović, Darko Spalević, Nenad Vanić, Milan Biševac, Miloš Krasić and others. While all Kosovar Serbian and most Kosovar Albanian players represented Yugoslavia internationally, some opted to represent Albania, like Besnik Hasi or Mehmet Dragusha.

Three football players that were born in Kosovo (Milutin Šoškić, Fahrudin Jusufi, Vladimir Durković) were part of the Yugoslavia national football team, who won the gold medal at the 1960 Summer Olympics and the silver medal at the 1960 European Championship

After the Kosovo War in 1999, most Kosovar Albanian players opted for emigration and represented either the countries they emigrated in, or Albania. Some of them are Arjan Beqaj, Etrit Berisha, Lorik Cana, Debatik Curri, Armend Dallku, Besnik Hasi for Albania, Mehmet and Perparim Hetemaj, Njazi and Shefki Kuqi for Finland, Fatos Beqiraj, Jovan Tanasijević for Montenegro, Ardian Gashi for Norway, Emir Bajrami and Erton Fejzullahu for Sweden, Valon Behrami, Albert Bunjaku, Milaim Rama, Xherdan Shaqiri and Granit Xhaka for Switzerland

The Kosovo national football team was formed in the early 1990s and has played a number of friendly games. From 2014 to 2016, they played a number of matches recognised by FIFA, and from 2016 on, official FIFA matches. Their first competitive game was a 1-1 draw away to Finland in a World Cup qualifier.

League system (2020–21)

Men's

Women's

Kosovar footballers
There are several ethnic Albanians from Kosovo who have played, or are playing, football for other national teams. Lorik Cana, who last played for French side Nantes, and represented Albania national football team. Valon Behrami is a Kosovo-born Swiss international who plays for Udinese Calcio. Shefki Kuqi, who last played for Premier League side Newcastle United, is a naturalized citizen of Finland. Xhevat Prekazi, best known for his career with Turkish side Galatasaray S.K., is naturalized as a citizen of Turkey. Xherdan Shaqiri is an ethnic Albanians born in Kosovo who plays for the Swiss national team and Premier League side Liverpool, Granit Xhaka is a Switzerland-born footballer who plays for the Swiss national team and Premier League side Arsenal, originally from Kosovo of Albanian descent.

The most famous player in women's football from Kosovo is the former German international Fatmire Alushi, who last played for French side Paris Saint-Germain, she is married to Enis Alushi, a former Kosovo international.

Notes

References